Danutė Kvietkevičiūtė  (born 5 June 1939 in Druskininkai, Lithuania) is a Lithuanian textile designer.

After graduating from the Lithuanian Institute of Fine Arts, from 1967 she participated in exhibitions in Lithuania and abroad. Her works are on display at the Lithuanian National Museum and Čiurlionis National Museum of Fine Arts.

References

1939 births
Living people
People from Druskininkai
Artists from Vilnius
Vilnius Academy of Arts alumni
Textile designers